Greg Peterson (born January 21, 1984) is a former American football defensive end. He was most recently a member of the Hartford Colonials of the United Football League. He was drafted by the Tampa Bay Buccaneers in the fifth round of the 2007 NFL Draft. He played college football at North Carolina Central University.

Peterson also played for the Jacksonville Jaguars.  Peterson was signed and released during the 2010 off season by the Washington Redskins.

Early years
Peterson played high school football at East Duplin High School in Beulaville, North Carolina. During his senior year, he was named all-conference, all-state, was East Duplin’s Male Athlete of the Year and the teams Most Valuable Player.

College career
Peterson played college football at North Carolina Central University in Durham, North Carolina after spending two seasons at Hinds Community College in Raymond, Mississippi. During his senior year, he was named a Division II All-American and Sheridan Broadcasting Network Black College All-American. He finished his college career with 104 tackles, 10.5 sacks, three forced fumbles, two fumble recoveries, and one interception.

Professional career

Tampa Bay Buccaneers
Peterson was drafted by the Tampa Bay Buccaneers in the fifth round of the 2007 NFL Draft. He recorded his first career sack on September 30, 2007.

He was waived/injured on August 13, 2009 and subsequently reverted to injured reserve. Peterson was released with an injury settlement on August 20.

Jacksonville Jaguars
Peterson signed with the Jacksonville Jaguars on September 29, 2009.

Washington Redskins
Peterson signed with the Washington Redskins on April 15, 2010.  He was released June 20, 2010.

External links
Just Sports Stats
Tampa Bay Buccaneers Bio
Jacksonville Jaguars Bio

1984 births
Living people
Players of American football from North Carolina
American football defensive ends
American football defensive tackles
Hartford Colonials players
North Carolina Central Eagles football players
Tampa Bay Buccaneers players
Jacksonville Jaguars players
Washington Redskins players
Sacramento Mountain Lions players
People from Kenansville, North Carolina